RMS Durham Castle was a passenger ship built for the Union-Castle Mail Steamship Company in 1904. In 1939, the Admiralty requisitioned her for use as a store ship.

Construction and service

She served the Cape of Good Hope to Mombasa service from 1910, and continued in commercial service during the First World War, with occasional troopship duties. She was part of a convoy sailing up the English Channel in June 1918, in company with the Union-Castle  and escorted by the cruiser  and five destroyers. On 4 June HMS Kent was leaving the convoy, but owing to a misunderstanding, cut across Kenilworth Castles bows. Turning to avoid Kent, Kenilworth Castle instead collided with the destroyer , and sustained severe damage and several casualties.

Durham Castle sailed on the East African route from 1931, travelling via the Suez Canal, and was withdrawn from service in 1939 after being replaced by RMS Pretoria Castle. The Admiralty acquired her after the outbreak of the Second World War for use as a storeship. She was taken in tow, bound for Scapa Flow as a base accommodation ship, but on 26 January 1940 she struck a mine off Cromarty and sank. The mine was probably one that had been laid by U-57.

References

Ships of the Union-Castle Line at red-duster.co.uk 

1903 ships
Ships built on the River Clyde
Ships of the Union-Castle Line
Auxiliary ships of the Royal Navy
World War I merchant ships of the United Kingdom
Ocean liners of the United Kingdom
Maritime incidents in January 1940
World War II shipwrecks in the North Sea
Ships sunk by mines
Ships sunk by German submarines in World War II